Matahpi Peak is located in the Lewis Range, Glacier National Park in the U.S. state of Montana. Below the summit of Matahpi Peak lies Sexton Glacier.

Geology

Like other mountains in Glacier National Park, Matahpi Peak is composed of sedimentary rock laid down during the Precambrian to Jurassic periods.

See also
 Mountains and mountain ranges of Glacier National Park (U.S.)

References

Matahpi Peak
Mountains of Glacier National Park (U.S.)
Lewis Range
Mountains of Montana